The 2012 Oceania Sevens Championship was the fifth Oceania Sevens in men's rugby sevens. It was held at North Sydney Oval in Sydney, Australia. The winner qualified through to the 2013 Rugby World Cup Sevens tournament in Moscow.

Australia won the Oceania Sevens Championship by defeating Samoa 12-7.

Pool Stage

Pool A

Pool B

Knockout stage

Plate

Cup

References

2012
2012 in Australian rugby union
2012 rugby sevens competitions
Sports competitions in Sydney
Rugby sevens competitions in Australia
International rugby union competitions hosted by Australia
2012 in Oceanian rugby union